Atlanta Primus (born 21 April 1997) is a Jamaican 
professional footballer who plays as a forward for London City Lionesses. Born in England, she plays for the Jamaica women's national team.

Club career 
On 5 September 2020 Primus signed for London City. On 16 June 2021 Primus signed a one-year contract extension with London City.

International career 
Primus represented Jamaica in a friendly match against Costa Rica.

Personal life 
Primus is the daughter of former Reading and Portsmouth footballer Linvoy Primus. Through her father, she is of Jamaican and Vincentian descent.

References 

1997 births
Living people
Black British sportswomen
Blackburn Rovers L.F.C. players
Cal State Fullerton Titans women's soccer players
Citizens of Jamaica through descent
England women's youth international footballers
English people of Saint Vincent and the Grenadines descent
English sportspeople of Jamaican descent
English women's footballers
Jamaica women's international footballers
Jamaican people of English descent
Jamaican people of Saint Vincent and the Grenadines descent
Jamaican women's footballers
London City Lionesses players
Women's association football forwards